Oligella may refer to:
 Oligella (beetle), a genus of beetles in the family Ptiliidae
 Oligella (bacterium), a genus of bacteria in the family Burkholderiaceae